Chlorocypha is a genus of damselflies in the family Chlorocyphidae.

Species
The genus contains these species:
Chlorocypha aphrodite 
Chlorocypha cancellata 
Chlorocypha centripunctata  - giant jewel
Chlorocypha consueta  - ruby jewel, southern red jewel
Chlorocypha croceus 
Chlorocypha curta  - blue-tailed red jewel
Chlorocypha cyanifrons 
Chlorocypha dahli 
Chlorocypha dispar  - small red jewel
Chlorocypha fabamacula 
Chlorocypha frigida 
Chlorocypha ghesquierei 
Chlorocypha glauca  - eastern red-tipped jewel
Chlorocypha grandis 
Chlorocypha hasta 
Chlorocypha helenae 
Chlorocypha hintzi 
Chlorocypha jacksoni 
Chlorocypha luminosa  - orange jewel
Chlorocypha molindica 
Chlorocypha mutans 
Chlorocypha neptunus 
Chlorocypha radix  - western red-tipped jewel
Chlorocypha rubida 
Chlorocypha rubriventris 
Chlorocypha schmidti 
Chlorocypha selysi  - blue-nuzzled jewel
Chlorocypha seydeli 
Chlorocypha sharpae 
Chlorocypha tenuis 
Chlorocypha trifaria  - Uganda red jewel
Chlorocypha victoriae 
Chlorocypha wittei

References

Chlorocyphidae
Zygoptera genera
Taxa named by Frederic Charles Fraser
Taxonomy articles created by Polbot